Francisco Fernando Castro Gamboa (born 4 September  1990 in Talagante, Chile) is a Chilean footballer who plays for Deportes Iberia in the Segunda División Profesional de Chile as a winger.

Career
In 2009 Castro ascended to the first team of Cobreloa, after playing 4 years on the youth club. On August 11, 2010 he signed with Universidad de Chile with a free agent after leaving Cobreloa on his own, but after claims of the ANFP and Cobreloa the player didn't sign a contract with Universidad de Chile, and he returned to Cobreloa. On August 18, Castro finally signed with Universidad de Chile after negotiations with Cobreloa, acquiring the 65% of the player, on 250.000 US dollars. He scored his first goal with La U in a match against Unión San Felipe, for the 2011 Copa Chile. He was the  top-scorer of La U in the 2011 Torneo de Clausura with 8 goals.

Honours

Club
 Universidad de Chile
 Primera División de Chile (3): 2011 Apertura, 2011 Clausura, 2012 Apertura
 Copa Sudamericana (1): 2011
 Supercopa de Chile (1): 2015
 Copa Chile (1): 2015

 Unión Española
 Primera División de Chile (1): 2013 Transición

References

External links
 

Living people
1990 births
Footballers from Santiago
Chilean footballers
Chile international footballers
Cobreloa footballers
Universidad de Chile footballers
Unión Española footballers
Deportes Iquique footballers
C.D. Antofagasta footballers
A.C. Barnechea footballers
Unión La Calera footballers
Cobresal footballers
Santiago Wanderers footballers
Deportes Iberia footballers
Chilean Primera División players
Primera B de Chile players
Segunda División Profesional de Chile players
People from Santiago Metropolitan Region

Association football wingers